Bad Sister is a 2014 Chinese romantic comedy film directed by Kim Tae-kyun and starring Ivy Chen, Ji Jin-hee and Cheney Chen. The film was released on November 28, 2014.

Plot
The story of a father who wants to stop his daughter's wedding and ended up teaming with the groom's equally disapproving older sister.

Cast
 Ivy Chen
 Ji Jin-hee
 Cheney Chen 
 Christy Chung
 Qi Xi
 Li Xinyun
 Woo Hye-lim
 Liu Yiwei
 Xie Dongshen
 Liu Xunzimo

Box office
By December 5, 2014, the film had earned ¥8.79 million at the Chinese box office.

References

2014 films
2010s Mandarin-language films
2014 romantic comedy films
Chinese romantic comedy films
Films directed by Kim Tae-kyun